Luke 14 is the fourteenth chapter of the Gospel of Luke in the New Testament of the Christian Bible. It records one miracle performed by Jesus Christ on a Sabbath day, followed by His teachings and parables. The book containing this chapter is anonymous, but early Christian tradition uniformly affirmed that Luke the Evangelist composed this Gospel as well as the Acts of the Apostles.

Text
The original text was written in Koine Greek. This chapter is divided into 35 verses.

Textual witnesses
Some early manuscripts containing the text of this chapter are:
Papyrus 75 (AD 175-225; verse 27 contains a staurogram)
Papyrus 45 (~250)
Codex Vaticanus (325-350)
Codex Sinaiticus (330-360)
Codex Bezae (~400)
Codex Washingtonianus (~400)
Codex Alexandrinus (400-440)
Papyrus 97 (~600; extant verses 7-14).

Jesus being carefully watched
The chapter opens on a Sabbath day, when Jesus has been invited into the home of one of the rulers of the Pharisees, presumably directly after the synagogue service. He is 'watched carefully'  or 'craftily'. F. W. Farrar in the Cambridge Bible for Schools and Colleges notes a resonance with the words of :
The wicked watches the righteous, and seeks to slay him.
A man with dropsy (swellings caused by bodily fluids, also called edema) is there.

Verses 3-6
And Jesus, answering, spoke to the lawyers and Pharisees, saying, “Is it lawful to heal on the Sabbath?”
Nothing had been said; Jesus responds to the thoughts of his adversaries. He heals the man, and lets him go (or sends him away). A further dialogue follows:"Which of you, having a son or an ox that has fallen into a well, will not immediately pull him out on a sabbath day?"
And they could not reply to this.
Some manuscripts, in place of "a son", refer to a donkey.

Take the Lowly Place 

In Matthew's Gospel, the parallel passage to Luke's Parable of the Great Banquet is also set as a wedding feast (Matthew 22:1-14).

Jesus always made his parables relatable to the layman. A wedding, in the days of the Jews, was a very sacred and joyous thing. Some even lasted up to or more than a week. When Jesus told this parable, many people were able to understand the picture he was trying to create because he used a Jewish wedding as the setting of the story.

It is similar to Matthew 18:4.

David Brown notes that this parable includes "a reproduction" of Proverbs 25:6–7.

Parable of the Great Supper 

The Parable of the Great Banquet or the Wedding Feast or the Marriage of the King's Son (verses 16-24) is also found in Matthew . A variant of the parable also appears in Saying 64 of the Gnostic Gospel of Thomas. Many guests are invited to the banquet, but they "all alike"  offered excuses, of which three examples are given.

The eschatological image of a wedding also occurs in the parable of the Faithful Servant and the parable of the Ten Virgins. Here, it includes the extension of the original invitation (to Jews) to also include Gentiles. In Luke, the invitation is extended particularly to "the poor, the crippled, the blind and the lame", evidencing explicit concern for the "poor and the outcasts".

Leaving All to Follow Christ 

Counting the Cost, or in the NIV: The Cost of Being a Disciple or in the NRSV: The Cost of Discipleship or in the NKJV: Leaving All to Follow Christ, are titles given to verses 25-33 in this chapter, which include a pair of illustrations of the importance of deliberating in advance "whether they were able and prepared to bear all their losses and persecutions to which the profession of the gospel would expose them". The first title comes from the phrase "count the cost", which occurs in the King James Version of the passage, as well as some other versions.

Eric Franklin argues that the requirement to "hate" in verse 26 is "Semitic exaggeration", and Joseph Benson envisages that hatred "signifies only an inferior degree of love".

American New Testament scholar Joel B. Green suggests that it is unclear what kind of tower is being referred to in the first illustration, but notes that the message is that a "thoroughgoing fidelity to God's salvific aim" is required, "manifest in one's identity as a disciple of Jesus". This command is interpreted and practised in different ways by different Christians. Some groups, such as the Bruderhof or Hutterites see it as a call to forsake all possessions to follow Jesus. Others read it simply as a matter of having Christ be the center of one's heart.

Salt
Salt is 'good' in biblical thought for giving taste where there is none (: Can flavorless food be eaten without salt?) and for preserving what otherwise would perish.

See also 
 Sermon on the Mount
 Sermon on the Plain
 Ministry of Jesus
 Parables of Jesus
 Other related Bible parts: Matthew 5, 22, 23

References

External links 
 King James Bible - Wikisource
English Translation with Parallel Latin Vulgate
Online Bible at GospelHall.org (ESV, KJV, Darby, American Standard Version, Bible in Basic English)
Multiple bible versions at Bible Gateway (NKJV, NIV, NRSV etc.)

Gospel of Luke chapters